The Following is a List of Flags used in Norfolk Island in Australia.

State Flag

Historical Flags

See also

List of Australian flags

References 

Australia
 
Norfolk Island culture